Helmuth Arne Torkild Emin Søbirk (8 September 1916 – 19 August 1992)  was a Danish amateur football player, who played 30 games and scored 10 goals for the Denmark national football team. Due to World War II, 10 of his last 14 internationals were matches against Sweden. Søbirk spent his club career with BK Frem and B 93. He was a forward and known for his trickery and cheeky style, which could zap his opponent's confidence.

Søbirk worked as a hospital porter and radio dealer.

Honours 
 Danish Championships: 1935-36, 1940–41 and 1943–44 with Frem, 1938-39 with B 93

References

External links 
 Danish national team profile
 Boldklubben Frem profile 

1916 births
1992 deaths
Danish men's footballers
Denmark international footballers
Boldklubben Frem players
Boldklubben af 1893 players
Association football midfielders
Footballers from Copenhagen